Stephen J. Ceci is an American psychologist at Cornell University. He studies the accuracy of children's courtroom testimony (as it applies to allegations of physical abuse, sexual abuse, and neglect), and he is an expert in the development of intelligence and memory. He has been the recipient of numerous awards, including the prestigious Lifetime Contribution Awards from the American Psychological Association (APA) and the Association for Psychological Science (APS) as well as many divisional and smaller society awards.

He received the E. L. Thorndike Award in 2014.

Education
Ceci received his B.A. in 1973 from the University of Delaware, his M.A. in 1975 from the University of Pennsylvania and his Ph.D. in 1978 from the University of Exeter, England, where he studied with Michael Howe. He holds a lifetime endowed chair in developmental psychology at Cornell.

National advisory boards
Ceci is a member of five national advisory boards:
 The White House Task Force on Federal Funding Priorities for Research on Children and Adolescents
 National Science Foundation Advisory Board on Social, Economic and Behavioral Sciences
 The Canadian Institute of Advanced Research
 The National Academy of Sciences' Board on Cognitive, Behavioral and Sensory Sciences
 The National Research Council's SERP (Strategic Educational Research and Planning Committee).

He is the founding co-editor of Psychological Science in the Public Interest, published by APS.

Career
In 1995, Ceci was part of an 11-member American Psychological Association task force led by Ulric Neisser which published "Intelligence: Knowns and Unknowns," a report written in response to The Bell Curve.

Ceci introduced in 1990 his "Bio-Ecological Theory of Intelligence", which holds that the level of mental activities or IQ are dependent on context. For example, he says traditional conceptions of intelligence ignore the role of society in shaping intelligence and underestimate the intelligence of non-Western societies.

He has been conducting research on women's underrepresentation in science. This research and analysis has been praised by many commentaries, and his book "The Mathematics of Sex" has received endorsements from Diane Halpern, David Lubinski, Christina Hoff Sommers, Frank Farley, and Marcia Linn. Recently, his research with Wendy M. Williams has revealed that faculty prefer to hire women professors over identically qualified men.

Ceci's article (co-written with Maggie Bruck), "The Suggestibility of Child Witnesses," won the 1994 Robert Chin Memorial Award for the most outstanding article on child abuse. His book (co-written with Maggie Bruck), "Jeopardy in the Courtroom: A Scientific Analysis of Children's Testimony," on the credibility of children's testimony in child abuse trials, received the 2000 William James Award for Excellence in Psychology. In 2003 Ceci received the American Psychological Association Award for Distinguished Scientific Applications of Psychology.

Ceci has been the recipient of major lifetime achievement awards in psychological science, including lifetime awards from the American Psychological Association (2003), the Association for Psychological Science (2005), the American Academy of Forensic Psychology (2001), and the  Society for Research in Child Development (SRCD) (2013). In 2015 he received the Edward L. Thorndike Award for lifetime contribution for empirical and theoretical research.

See also
Bioecological model

References

External links
Stephen J. Ceci website at Cornell University

Alumni of the University of Exeter
Cornell University faculty
American developmental psychologists
Living people
Intelligence researchers
21st-century American psychologists
Fellows of the Association for Psychological Science
Year of birth missing (living people)